The 2021 Blackburn with Darwen Borough Council election took place on 6 May 2021 to elect members of Blackburn with Darwen Borough Council in England. This was on the same day as other local elections. One-third of the seats were up for election.

Results

Council Composition 
Prior to the election, the composition of the council was:

LD - Liberal Democrat 
Ind - Independent politician

After the election, the composition of the council was:

Ind - Independent politician

Ward results

Audley & Queen's Park

Bastwell and Daisyfield

Billinge and Beardwood

Blackburn Central

Blackburn South and Lower Darwen

Blackburn South East

Darwen East

Darwen South

Darwen West

Ewood

Little Harwood and Whitebirk

Livesey with Pleasington

Mill Hill and Moorgate

Roe Lee

Shear Brow and Corporation Park

Wensley Fold

West Pennine

References 

Blackburn with Darwen
Blackburn with Darwen Borough Council elections